The Boterwaag is a former weigh house for butter in The Hague, Netherlands. The right half is a café.

History
The left-half of the building was designed by the architect-painter Bartholomeus van Bassen. He designed and built it in 1650, after the Prinsegracht canal was dug in 1640. He oversaw both projects in his role as city architect and headman of the Guild of St. Luke. After he died in 1652, the local painters became dissatisfied with the guild and founded the Confrerie Pictura in 1656, which met upstairs. They shared their meeting room upstairs with the guild of apothecaries, and the city apothecary shop was across the street. In 1681 the right half was built as an extension, and new scales were installed inside that can still be seen by visitors to the café there.

In 2013 a replica of the 17th-century brass bell was replaced on the facade that had been stolen in 1980s.

References

Painters from The Hague
Weigh houses
Rijksmonuments in The Hague
History of The Hague